KYRX (97.3 FM) is a radio station licensed to Marble Hill, Missouri in the United States.  The station broadcasts a sports format and is owned by Withers Broadcasting, through licensee Withers Broadcasting Company of Missouri, LLC.

On August 3, 2022, KYRX changed its format from classic country to sports, branded as "Fox Sports 97.3".

Previous logo

References

External links
KYRX's official website

YRX
Fox Sports Radio stations
Sports radio stations in the United States